Lacona station, also known as New York Central and Hudson River Railroad Station and Depot, is a historic railway depot located at Lacona in Oswego County, New York.  It was built in 1891 by the New York Central and Hudson River Railroad.  It is a small rectangular, one story, gable ended structure.

It was listed on the National Register of Historic Places in 2002 as Lacona Railroad Station and Depot.

References

Railway stations on the National Register of Historic Places in New York (state)
Railway stations in the United States opened in 1891
Transportation buildings and structures in Oswego County, New York
Former New York Central Railroad stations
National Register of Historic Places in Oswego County, New York
Former railway stations in New York (state)